Tall Girl is a 2019 American teen romantic comedy film directed by Nzingha Stewart, from a screenplay by Sam Wolfson. The film stars Ava Michelle, Griffin Gluck, Sabrina Carpenter, Paris Berelc, Luke Eisner, Clara Wilsey, Anjelika Washington, Rico Paris, Angela Kinsey, and Steve Zahn. It was released by Netflix on September 13, 2019.

Plot 
She has been tall for her age since she was three, which has made her insecure her whole life. Students regularly joke about her height. In contrast, Jodi's older sister Harper is of average height and has won multiple beauty pageants. Jack Dunkleman, a life-long friend, frequently asks her out, but she is reluctant, partly because he's much shorter than her.

Stig Mohlin, a Swedish foreign exchange student, joins Jodi's class, and she is immediately interested in him, along with most girls in her school. However, Kimmy Stitcher, her bully, starts showing him around. Dunkleman is distressed to learn that Stig will be staying at his house as the host family. Jodi asks her sister for help getting Stig to notice her. Harper and their mother help her with a complete makeover.

Kimmy and Schnipper prank call Jodi, pretending to be Stig and asking her to homecoming. To Fareeda's frustration, Jodi hides in the bathroom to avoid Kimmy. Stumbling across Stig playing the piano, he encourages her to play, and they sing the duet "I've Never Been in Love Before" from the musical Guys and Dolls.

Jodi finds her father has organized a meeting of a club for tall people in their house, which she finds upsetting. Stig calls, and at first, thinking it is another prank call, she yells at him, but he invites her to watch a musical. She turns up to Dunkleman's house, and he becomes jealous when he realizes she is there to see Stig. He continually interrupts their evening, but as Stig escorts Jodi home, they kiss. Later, feeling guilty, Stig asks Dunkleman for advice, and he tells him to focus on being with Kimmy. Jodi gets angry at Dunkleman when she learns this.

Meanwhile, another girl—Liz—asks Dunkleman on a date. Schnipper is now interested in Jodi, so he gets Kimmy to ask her to join them for an escape room activity; Jodi ditches a concert with Fareeda to go. In the escape room, they kiss in couples: Jodi and Schnipper, Kimmy and Stig, and Dunkleman and Liz, until Jodi gets frustrated and leaves. Jealous, Stig talks to Jodi and agrees to go on a date to Harper's pageant competition. Harper wins, but Stig does not turn up. At Dunkleman's party, Stig explains that he lost track of time.

Dunkleman rejects Liz when she asks him to the homecoming dance. He gives Jodi platform heels to apologize for being a bad friend. Jodi is sent a video from after she left the party. Stig pretended that Jodi had an unrequited love for him and says he stood her up. Dunkleman and Stig have a fistfight, causing him to get a black eye.

At the homecoming dance, Kimmy and Stig are crowned Homecoming Queen and King, but he breaks up with her. Jodi arrives in the high heels Dunkleman gave her and makes a speech expressing newfound confidence in herself. Stig asks Jodi out, but she rejects him. She talks to Dunkleman: he reveals the reason he always carries a milk crate:  he stands on it and leans in to kiss her.

Cast

Production 
In November 2018, it was announced that Netflix would collaborate with McG of Wonderland Sound and Vision for a fourth time on the film Tall Girl, with Nzingha Stewart set as the director. In January 2019, Ava Michelle, Griffin Gluck, Luke Eisner, Sabrina Carpenter, Paris Berelc, Steve Zahn, Angela Kinsey, Anjelika Washington, Clara Wilsey, and Rico Paris joined the cast of the film.

Principal photography on the film began in January 2019 in New Orleans and ended in March 2019.

Release
The film released on September 13, 2019. On October 17, 2019, Netflix announced that the film had been viewed by over 41 million viewers after its release on their platform.

Reception
The site's critics consensus reads, "While charming at times, Tall Girl is mostly an uninspired teen comedy that fails to bring anything new to the genre."

Sequel
On December 1, 2020, DiscussingFilm reported that Tall Girl 2 was in the works at Netflix, with Michelle returning as Jodi alongside the majority of the supporting cast. Filming began in April 2021, with Sam Wolfson returning as the screenplay writer. Tall Girl 2 was eventually released on February 11, 2022.

See also 
Heightism

References

External links 

2019 films
2019 romantic comedy films
2010s high school films
2010s teen comedy films
2010s teen romance films
American high school films
American romantic comedy films
American teen comedy films
American teen romance films
Films about beauty pageants
English-language Netflix original films
Films set in New Orleans
Films shot in New Orleans
Human height
Wonderland Sound and Vision films
2010s English-language films
2010s American films